Tabarka Rocks - A rock formation in North-Western Tunisia, on the coast of the Mediterranean Sea to the West of the city Tabarka. The rocks have created a series of towering crags along the coast of the sea.

Landforms of Tunisia
Rock formations of Africa